The Roman Catholic Archdiocese of Maseru is the metropolitan see for the ecclesiastical province of Maseru in Lesotho. The cathedral church of the diocese is the Our Lady of Victories Cathedral.

History
 1894.05.08: Established as Apostolic Prefecture of Basutoland from the Apostolic Vicariate of Kimberley in Orange in South Africa 
 1909.02.18: Promoted as Apostolic Vicariate of Basutoland
 1951.01.11: Promoted as Diocese of Maseru
 1961.01.03: Promoted as Metropolitan Archdiocese of Maseru

Leadership
Prefects Apostolic of Basutoland 
 Father Jules-Joseph Cénez, OMI (1895 – 25 January 1909); see below
Vicars Apostolic of Basutoland
 Jules-Joseph Cénez, OMI (25 January 1909 – 24 May 1930); see above
 Joseph Bonhomme, OMI (25 April 1933 – 8 March 1947)
 Joseph Delphis Des Rosiers, OMI (11 March 1948 – 11 January 1951); see below
Bishops of Maseru
 Joseph Delphis Des Rosiers, OMI (11 January 1951 – 3 January 1961), appointed Bishop of Qacha’s Nek; see above
Archbishops of Maseru
 Emanuel Mabathoana, OMI (3 January 1961 – 20 September 1966)
 Alfonso Liguori Morapeli, OMI (13 April 1967 – 17 May 1989)
 Bernard Mohlalisi, OMI (11 June 1990 – 30 June 2009)
 Gerard Tlali Lerotholi (30 June 2009 – present)

Suffragan dioceses
 Leribe
 Mohale’s Hoek
 Qacha’s Nek

See also
Catholic Church in Lesotho
List of Roman Catholic dioceses in Lesotho

References

Sources
 GCatholic.org

Maseru
Maseru